Obereopsis walshae is a species of beetle in the family Cerambycidae. It was described by Warren Samuel Fisher in 1937. It is known from Nepal, Laos, Myanmar, Java, Malaysia, and Sumatra.

Subspecies
 Obereopsis walshae walshae (Fisher, 1937)
 Obereopsis walshae infranigra Breuning, 1968

References

walshae
Beetles described in 1937